Jay Neugeboren (born Jacob Mordecai Neugeboren; May 30, 1938 in Brooklyn, New York, United States) is an American novelist, essayist, and short story writer.

Education
Jay Neugeboren was born In Brooklyn, New York and raised in Flatbush.  He went to Public School Number 246, Walt Whitman Junior High School (where he was its first president), and Erasmus Hall High School.  He received a B. A., Phi Beta Kappa, from Columbia University, and a Master of Arts from Indiana University, where he was a University Fellow.

Career 
He is the author of 24 books. He has won numerous awards, including fellowships from the National Endowment of the Arts, the Massachusetts Council on the Arts, and the Guggenheim Foundation.

He has taught at Columbia University, Indiana University, Stanford University, the State University of New York at Old Westbury, the University of Freiburg (Germany), and was for many years (1971-2001) Professor and writer in residence at the University of Massachusetts at Amherst.

Awards
His novella, “Corky’s Brother,” won the Transatlantic Review Novella Award (1969).  He has had stories in more than 50 anthologies, including Best American Short Stories, O. Henry Prize Stories, and Penguin Modern Stories.

He has won prizes for his fiction (The Stolen Jew: American Jewish Committee Award for Best Novel of the Year, 1981; Before My Life Began: Edward Lewis Wallant Memorial Prize for Best Novel of the Year, 1985), and non-fiction (Imagining Robert: New York Times Notable Book of the Year; Transforming Madness: National Alliance on Mental Illness, “Ken” Award).  He is the only writer to have won six consecutive P.E.N. Syndicated Fiction Awards.

His screenplay for The Hollow Boy (American Playhouse, PBS, 1991, was chosen best screenplay of the year by the Los Angeles Times and at the Houston Film Festival.

Personal life
He has been married three times, and has three children.

Bibliography
 Max Baer and the Star of David.  (Mandel Vilar Press, 2016)
 Poli: A Mexican Boy in Early Texas. Texas Tech University Press. 2014. (Special 25th Anniversary Edition)
 The Diagnostic Manual of Mishegas, with Michael B. Friedman and Lloyd I. Sederer (2013)
 The American Sun & Wind Moving Picture Company, Texas Tech University Press (2013)
 The Other Side of the World, Two Dollar Radio (2012)
 You Are My Heart and Other Stories, Two Dollar Radio (2011)
 1940, Two Dollar Radio (2008)
 News From the New American Diaspora and Other Tales of Exile, University of Texas Press (2005)
 (Editor) Hillside Diary and Other Writings by Robert Gary Neugeboren, Center for Psychiatric Rehabilitation (2004)
 Open Heart: A Patient's Story of Life-Saving Medicine and Life-Giving Friendship, Houghton Mifflin (2003)
 Transforming Madness: New Lives for People Living with Mental Illness, William Morrow (1999)
 Imagining Robert: My Brother, Madness, and Survival, Morrow (1997)
 Don't Worry About the Kids: Stories, University of Massachusetts (1992)
 Poli: A Mexican Boy in Early Texas, (with Tom Leamon, illustrator), Corona (1989)
 Before My Life Began, Simon and Schuster (1985)
 The Stolen Jew, Holt Rinehart (1981)
 (Editor) The Story of Story Magazine: A Memoir by Martha Foley, Norton (1980)
 An Orphan's Tale, Holt Rinehart (1976)
 Sam's Legacy, Holt Rinehart (1974)
 Corky's Brother and Other Stories, Farrar Straus (1969)
 Parentheses: An Autobiographical Journey, Dutton (1970)
 Listen Ruben Fontanez, Houghton Mifflin (1968)
 Big Man, Houghton Mifflin (1966)
American Jewish Biographies, ed. Murray Polner.  Lakeville Press, New York, 1982,

References

Writers from Brooklyn
Jewish American writers
1938 births
Living people
Columbia College (New York) alumni
Indiana University alumni
Erasmus Hall High School alumni
American memoirists
People from Flatbush, Brooklyn
21st-century American Jews